Tyronne Kevin Stowe (born May 30, 1965) is a former American football linebacker that played for ten seasons in the National Football League.  Stowe attended Passaic High School.  He played college football at Rutgers University.  He currently works as a pastor in Chandler, Arizona.

See also
 List of Rutgers University people

References

1965 births
Living people
American football linebackers
Passaic High School alumni
Sportspeople from Passaic, New Jersey
Sportspeople from Chandler, Arizona
Rutgers Scarlet Knights football players
Phoenix Cardinals players
Pittsburgh Steelers players
Seattle Seahawks players
Washington Redskins players